The Waltons were an anarchic band from the Isle of Wight in the UK. The socio-political post-punk 5-piece fronted by Tony Gregson (aka Tony Walton), had one minor hit with "Brown Rice" (the long grain mix) in the mid-1980s, and starred in Annika, an early Colin Nutley film shot on the Island about a boy falling in love with a Swedish exchange student.

Original line-up

 Tony Walton - lead vocals, rhythm guitar
 Hank Torso - lead guitar, tenor sax
 Dave Cheesybits - bass
 Dread (Family Man) Jones - drums, percussion
 O.B. Lee - alto saxophone

Later to be joined by Sean the Riddler, on various keyboards and found hubcaps. 

They were regular live performers on the Isle of Wight, but never quite succeeded in totally breaking away from the island. They allegedly came to blows in the late 1980s whilst touring the Netherlands in an old hippy bus driven by ex-paratrooper and traveller, Sam Ganja. They disbanded soon afterwards due to problems with drugs, alcohol and mental illness.

Discography

 "Dead Above the Neck" (cassette only) - 1985.  This can be downloaded on mp3 from Myspace or as individual tracks from The House of Cheese
 "The Painting & the Photograph" (Feet on the Street, compilation album) - 1985
 "Brown Rice" / "Pain Killing Time" (7") 
 "Brown Rice" / "Long Grain Mix" / "Pain Killing Time" (12")
 "Black Leather" (Vaguely Sunny, IOW Rock Anthology CD) - 1995

See also
IOW bands

External links
The Waltons on Myspace
The House of Cheese
Waltons Article By Dr Brian Hinton.
IOW Rock

English punk rock groups
Anarcho-punk groups
Musical groups from the Isle of Wight